The 2022 African Women's Junior Handball Championship was held in Conakry, Guinea from 19 to 26 February 2022. It also acted as qualification tournament for the 2022 Women's Junior World Handball Championship to be held in Slovenia.

Draw
The draw was held on 15 January 2022 at the CAHB headquarters in Abidjan, Ivory Coast.

Preliminary round
All times are local (UTC±0).

Group A

Group B

Knockout stage

Bracket

5–8th place bracket

5–8th place semifinals

Semifinals

Seventh place game

Fifth place game

Third place game

Final

Final standings

References

2022 in African handball
African Women's Junior Handball Championship
International handball competitions hosted by Guinea
African Junior
Junior
Sport in Conakry
African Women's Junior Handball Championship